Laussa is a municipality in the district of Steyr-Land in the Austrian state of Upper Austria.

Geography
Laussa lies in the Traunviertel. About 36 percent of the municipality is forest, and 58 percent is farmland.

References

Cities and towns in Steyr-Land District